Frederick Eckman (27 October 1924 – 28 October 1996) was a magazine and journal editor or publisher.

References

1924 births
1996 deaths
20th-century American businesspeople